The Australian Grand Prix is an annual motor racing event which is under contract to host Formula One until 2035. One of the oldest surviving motorsport competitions held in Australia, the Grand Prix has moved frequently with 23 different venues having been used since it was first run at Phillip Island in 1928. The race became part of the Formula One World Championship in 1985. Since 1996, it has been held at the Albert Park Circuit in Melbourne, with the exceptions of 2020 and 2021, when the races were cancelled due to the COVID-19 pandemic. Before that, it was held in Adelaide.

History

Pre-war

While an event called the Australian Grand Prix was staged in 1927 at the grass surface Goulburn Racecourse held as a series of sprints, it is generally accepted that the Australian Grand Prix began as the 100 Miles Road Race held at the Phillip Island road circuit in 1928. The inaugural race was won by Arthur Waite in what was effectively an entry supported by the Austin Motor Company, a modified Austin 7. For eight years, races, first called the Australian Grand Prix in 1929, continued on the rectangular dirt road circuit. This was the era of the Australian "special", mechanical concoctions of disparate chassis and engine that were every bit as capable as the Grand Prix machines imported from Europe. For all the ingenuity of the early Australian mechanic-racers, Bugattis dominated the results, taking four consecutive wins from 1929 to 1932. The last Phillip Island race was in 1935 and the title lapsed for three years. An AGP style event was held on Boxing Day, 1936 at the South Australian town of Victor Harbor for a centennial South Australian Grand Prix before the Australian Grand Prix title was revived in 1938 for the grand opening of what would become one of the world's most famous race tracks, Mount Panorama just outside the semi-rural town of Bathurst. Only just completed, with a tar seal for the circuit still a year away, the race was won by Englishman Peter Whitehead racing a new voiturette ERA B-Type that was just too fast for the locally developed machinery. One more race was held, at the Lobethal Circuit near the South Australian town of Lobethal in 1939, before the country was plunged into World War II.

Post-war

Early post-war races
In the immediate post-war era, racing was sparse with competitors using pre-war cars with supplies cobbled together around the rationing of fuel and tyres. Mount Panorama held the first post-war Grand Prix in 1947, beginning a rotational system between the Australian States, as fostered by the Australian Automobile Association. A mixture of stripped-down production sports cars and Australian "specials" were to take victories as the race travelled amongst temporary converted airfield circuits and street circuits like Point Cook, Leyburn, Nuriootpa and Narrogin before, on the races return to Mount Panorama in 1952, the way to the future was pointed by Doug Whiteford racing a newly imported Talbot-Lago Formula One car to victory. Grand Prix machinery had already been filtering through in the shape of older Maserati and OSCAs and smaller Coopers but had yet to prove to be superior to the locally developed cars. The end of the Australian "specials" was coming, but the magnificent Maybach-based series of specials driven exuberantly by Stan Jones would give many hope for the next few years.

Lex Davison, who for several years would experiment with sports car engines in smaller Formula 2 chassis, took his first of four victories in a Jaguar engined Formula 2 HWM in 1954, while the previous year Whiteford won his third and final Grand Prix as for the first time racing cars thundered around the streets surrounding the Albert Park Lake in inner Melbourne. That circuit, which for four brief years gave Australia the strongest taste of the grandeur surrounding European Grand Prix racing, was 40 years later very much modified, used to host the 1996 Australian Grand Prix as the modern Formula One world championship venue. Jack Brabham took his first of three AGP wins in 1955 at the short Port Wakefield Circuit in South Australia. The race is significant in that Brabham was driving a Bristol powered Cooper T40, the first ever rear-engine car to win the Grand Prix.

The Grand Prix returned to Albert Park in 1956, Melbourne's Olympic Games year to play host to a group of visiting European teams, led by Stirling Moss and the factory Maserati racing team who brought a fleet of 250F Grand Prix cars and 300S sports racing cars. Moss won the Grand Prix from Maserati teammate Jean Behra. That 1956 race would inspire the next great era of the Grand Prix.

Tasman Formula
The growing influence of engineer-drivers Jack Brabham and a couple of years behind him New Zealander Bruce McLaren would transform the race. Brabham, who first won the Grand Prix in 1955 in an obsolete Cooper T40 Bristol he had brought home from his first foray into English racing, would test new developments for Cooper during the European winter, beginning a flood of Cooper-Climax Grand Prix machinery into Australia and New Zealand before Brabham started building his own cars, as well as the appearance of Lotus chassis as well, finally killing off the Australian "specials". With European Formula One restricted by the 1.5-litre regulations and big powerful 2.5-litre Australian cars were tremendously attractive to the European teams and when BRM Grand Prix team toured Australia during the summer of 1962, the seed grew that became the Tasman Series.

The top European Formula One teams and drivers raced the European winters in Australia and New Zealand from 1963 to 1969 playing host to a golden age for racing in the region for which the Australian Grand Prix (and the New Zealand Grand Prix) became jewels of the summer. The popularity of the Tasman formulae was directly responsible for 1966's "return to power" in Formula One, and having spent years developing with Repco the Brabham cars and eventually the Oldsmobile-based Repco V8s in the Tasman series gave Jack Brabham the opportunity to unexpectedly dominate Formula One in his Brabhams with a ready-proven lightweight car that left Ferrari and the British "garagistes" struggling with their heavy, technically fragile or underpowered cars until the appearance of the Lotus-Cosworth in 1967.

The Formula One stars of the era all visited the Tasman Series, including World Champions Jim Clark, John Surtees, Phil Hill, Jackie Stewart, Graham Hill and Jochen Rindt, while other F1 regulars Timmy Mayer, Pedro Rodriguez, Piers Courage, leading teams from Cooper, Lotus, Lola, BRM, even the four wheel drive Ferguson P99 and finally, Ferrari, racing against the local stars, Jack Brabham, Bruce McLaren, Denny Hulme, Chris Amon, Frank Gardner, Frank Matich, Leo Geoghegan and Kevin Bartlett. Brabham won the Grand Prix three times, McLaren twice, Clark twice, the second was his last major victory before his untimely death, winning a highly entertaining battle with Chris Amon at the 1968 Australian Grand Prix at Sandown Raceway. Graham Hill won the 1966 race, with Amon winning the final Tasman formulae race in 1969 leading home Ferrari teammate Derek Bell for a dominant 1–2 at Lakeside Raceway.

Formula 5000
By the end of the decade, European teams were increasingly reluctant to commit to the Tasman Series in the face of longer home seasons, but also having to develop 2.5-litre versions of their 3.0 litre F1 engines. Local Tasman cars were declining as well and after originally opting a 2.0 litre version of Tasman to be the future of the Australia Grand Prix, the overwhelming support for the already well established Formula 5000 saw natural selection force CAMS' hand.

For the first half of the 1970s, the Tasman Series continued as a local series primarily for Formula 5000 racers, but by 1976, the Australian and New Zealand legs fractured apart and the Australian Grand Prix separated from the remnants and became a stand-alone race once more. During this era, the former Tasman stars, Matich, Geoghegan and Bartlett would continue on as a new generation of drivers emerged, some like Garrie Cooper (Elfin) and Graham McRae developing their own cars while others like Max Stewart, John McCormack and Alfredo Costanzo using European-built cars, mostly Lolas. Matich won two Grands Prix is his own cars before Stewart and McRae each took a pair of wins. Towards the end of the 1970s, the race again became a home to returning European-based antipodeans like Alan Jones and Larry Perkins with Warwick Brown winning the 1977 race, while in 1976, touring car racer John Goss completed a remarkable double becoming the only driver to win the Grand Prix and the Bathurst 1000 touring car race.

Calder Park
Declining economy and the dominance of the local scene by Group C touring cars towards the latter part of the 1970s saw Formula 5000 gradually fall out of favour. By 1980, the decision to replace was once again imminent; however, the form of Alan Jones in Formula One saw entrepreneur Bob Jane seize an opportunity to bring Formula One back as the Grand Prix Formula. The 1980 extravaganza held at Jane's Calder Park Raceway saw a combined field of Formula One and Formula 5000 padded out with the Australised version of Formula Atlantic cars, Formula Pacific. The newly crowned world champion, Jones swept the field aside in his Williams-Ford, but with only two F1 cars entering (the other being the Alfa Romeo 179 driven by Bruno Giacomelli).

The continuing disintegration of F5000 saw Jane concentrate the next four Grands Prix on the Formula Pacific (later rebadged as Formula Mondial) category and importing Formula One drivers to race the locals in fields almost entirely made up of Ralt RT4s. Brazilian Roberto Moreno dominated this era, winning three of the four races, ceding only the 1982 race to future four-time World Champion Alain Prost.

Jane's attempt to bring the World Championship to Calder Park ultimately failed, as did a bid by Melbourne's other circuit Sandown (though Sandown was able to attract a round of the World Sportscar Championship to its upgraded track in 1984). As it turned out, F1 would be tempted away from Melbourne by a far more attractive option but it was listed as a reserve race in the 1982 F1 calendar.

Formula One

Adelaide (1985–1995)

The Australian Grand Prix became a round of the FIA Formula One World Championship in 1985 with the last race of the season held on the street circuit in Adelaide. Whenever the teams came to Adelaide they enjoyed the party atmosphere.

The first ever Australian Grand Prix to be included as part of the Formula One World Championship was also the 50th AGP. The new 3.78 km Adelaide Street Circuit saw Brazilian Ayrton Senna on pole with a time of 1:19.843 in his Lotus–Renault. The race itself was a battle between Senna and Finland's Keke Rosberg driving a Williams–Honda for the last time. Run in oppressively hot conditions, the last race of the  season ran to its 2-hour time limit, though all scheduled 82 laps were run. Rosberg ultimately prevailed finishing 43 seconds in front of the Ligier–Renaults of Frenchmen Jacques Laffite and Philippe Streiff who actually collided at the hairpin at the end of Brabham Straight with only one lap to go when Streiff tried a passing move that resulted in his car suffering broken suspension, though not bad enough to cause retirement. Three time World Champion Austrian Niki Lauda drove his last Formula One race at this event. After starting 16th in his McLaren, he made his way to the lead by lap 57, but a lack of brakes cause him to crash into a wall in a sad end to his Formula One career. Australia had its own driver in the race with  World Champion Alan Jones driving a Lola–Hart. Jones, who started 19th, stalled at the start but fought his way to sixth by lap 20 before retiring later in the lap with electrical failure. The 1986 event was a three-way race for the Drivers' Championship. Briton Nigel Mansell and Brazilian Nelson Piquet in Williams–Hondas and Frenchman Alain Prost, in a comparatively underpowered McLaren–TAG/Porsche, were competing for the drivers' title. Mansell needed only third to guarantee the title, whilst Prost and Piquet needed to win and for Mansell to finish fourth or lower to take the title. Finn Keke Rosberg led for 62 laps before a puncture that caused damage to his McLaren; this was the 1982 champion's last Formula One race. Mansell fought to control the violently veering car and steered it to a safe stop. Prost took the lead, as Mansell's teammate Piquet had pitted as a pre-cautionary measure, and the Frenchman won the race and the championship. Prost had to fight back after a mid-race puncture, and stopped soon after the finish so as not to waste fuel, something he had done at every race he finished since his disqualification from the 1985 San Marino Grand Prix for being underweight after his McLaren ran out of fuel on his slow down lap after crossing the line first. 1987 saw Gerhard Berger win in his Ferrari while Ayrton Senna finished second but was then disqualified for technical irregularities in his last race for Lotus; Berger's teammate Michele Alboreto was then moved up to second place to make the final result a Ferrari 1–2.

1988, the last Grand Prix of the turbo era, saw Alain Prost win his seventh race of the season from McLaren teammate and newly crowned World Champion Ayrton Senna with outgoing champion Nelson Piquet third for Lotus, giving Honda turbo's all three podium positions. The race was also the 15th win and 15th pole in 16 races in a season of total dominance for McLaren-Honda, a domination not seen before or since in Formula One. 1989 was hit by a deluge of rain and the drivers, notably Prost, did not want to start the race because of the very wet conditions, particularly on the Brabham straight. This event came after controversial events 2 weeks before at the Japanese Grand Prix at Suzuka, where Prost had crashed into his hated teammate Senna, and Senna got going again and finished 1st on the road but after political discussions was disqualified for cutting the chicane before the pit straight at Suzuka; the repercussions of which dawned on the race. McLaren had decided to appeal Senna's disqualification; so Senna still had a chance of winning the championship. The race was delayed for sometime and there were discussions about whether the race should be started. Senna qualified on pole position, and had every intention of starting the race. The circuit was still being hammered by rain and was covered by water, but the drivers, including Prost relented and eventually they started. But an unconvinced Prost came in after one lap and withdrew; and Senna- who was still in an awful mental state from the previous race, immediately began driving as fast as he could. By the end of the first lap, due to Pierluigi Martini's slow Minardi holding up the two faster Williams cars of Belgian Thierry Boutsen and Italian Riccardo Patrese, Senna was an astonishing nine seconds ahead of Martini; the Williams cars soon passed Martini but by the end of the third lap, Senna was 23 seconds ahead of second-placed Boutsen. Yet even with such a huge lead which he extended even further, Senna continued to push very hard- taking very daring chances even for himself; the psychological dominance F1 had exuded over the Brazilian meant that he was known to take chances that most other drivers would not. Going down the Brabham straight on lap 13, Senna came up behind Briton Martin Brundle's Brabham-Judd, and Brundle decided to move over to let Senna pass. But Senna was blinded by thick spray; and the Brazilian did not lift off, causing him to hit the back of Brundle's car, tearing off his front left wheel and suspension and resulting in the Brazilian's retirement.  This effectively handing Prost his third Drivers' Championship; McLaren's appeal had not been decided yet, but with Senna failing to score, he was mathematically unable to catch Prost even if his Japanese Grand Prix victory stood, and it was not only overturned but Senna received a $100,000 fine and a six-month ban, both of which were rescinded. Boutsen won the race in the unimproved conditions, with the race called after it reached the two-hour time limit.

1990 was the 500th World Championship Grand Prix ever held; and it came after yet more controversial events at Suzuka. Senna had crashed into Prost at the very first corner on the first lap of the race; and he won the Drivers' Championship for the second time. The Australian Grand Prix that year was an incredibly exciting race: Senna led for 61 laps, but crashed near the entrance to the permanent race course because of gearbox problems. The race then turned into a dead-heat sprint between Nelson Piquet in his Benetton-Ford and Nigel Mansell in his Ferrari. Mansell charged through the field and repeatedly broke the lap record in pursuit of his former Williams teammate. This almost ended in disaster when the Ferrari almost hit the Benetton at the end of the Brabham Straight in a last-ditch overtaking move on the last lap. Piquet won from the Ferraris of Mansell and Prost. There was pre-race controversy when Prost refused to take part in both the annual end of season drivers' photo and the special photo shoot with the World Champions in attendance (including legendary five-time champion Juan Manuel Fangio, three-time champions Sir Jack Brabham, Jackie Stewart, Niki Lauda, and Nelson Piquet; and other world champions James Hunt, Alan Jones, Denny Hulme and Senna), as Prost was still disgusted and angry did not wish to appear in the photos with Senna following their controversial first corner crash in the previous race in Japan which gave the  World Championship to Senna.

The 1991 race was notable for being held in extremely wet and tricky conditions and the race was eventually stopped after 14 of the scheduled 82 laps and Ayrton Senna was declared the winner. Prost had been fired from Ferrari for making unsavory comments about the car after Suzuka; he did not compete in this race. The Drivers' Championship had already been decided in Senna's favour; but the Constructors' Championship was still yet to be decided between McLaren and Williams. Senna's victory plus his teammate Gerhard Berger's third gave McLaren its fourth consecutive Constructors' Championship; Williams (which was behind McLaren in points) drivers Mansell finished second (but crashed near the race's end at the chicane after the pits) and Riccardo Patrese finished fifth. This race held the record of being the shortest ever Formula One race as it only lasted 52 kilometres (33 miles)/24 minutes. It would eventually be surpassed by the 2021 Belgian Grand Prix, which lasted three laps, but was classified after only one official lap. Triple World Champion Nelson Piquet, who finished fifth, retired from Grand Prix racing following the race.

1992 saw Senna drive very hard to try to stay with new world champion Mansell's dominant Williams; this ended in Senna running into the back of Mansell at the last corner. Mansell retired from Formula One and went to compete in CART in the United States; Senna's teammate Gerhard Berger won the race. 1993 saw Senna win what was to be his 41st and final victory and final race for McLaren ahead of Alain Prost, who was competing in his final Formula One race in a Williams before he too retired. Senna embraced his once extremely bitter rival Prost on the podium. It was announced around this time that the Australian Grand Prix would be moving to Melbourne for 1996.

The 1994 was to see yet another memorable weekend. Following his win at the Japanese Grand Prix, Damon Hill was now one point behind championship leader Michael Schumacher. Nigel Mansell, returning to Formula One in place of the late Senna, was on pole but a poor start resulted in the two championship rivals Hill and Schumacher battling for the lead. But on lap 36, Schumacher went off the track, a result of oversteer, and this allowed Hill to catch up with Schumacher and take the inside line for the next corner. Schumacher turned in on Hill's Williams (whether on purpose or accidentally remains unknown) which sent the Benetton up on two wheels and into the tyre barrier, Schumacher retiring on the spot. Hill came out of the incident with a broken wishbone on his front-left suspension, he pitted and retired from the race, handing the title to Schumacher. The sister Williams of the 41-year-old Nigel Mansell went on to win the race, becoming the oldest Grand Prix winner since Jack Brabham in 1970.

In 1995, Mika Häkkinen suffered a tyre failure at the early part of the first qualifying session at the high speed Brewery Bend between Jones and Brabham Straights, which resulted in him crashing heavily into the outside wall. He was critically injured in the crash and was saved only due to an emergency cricothyroidotomy that was performed by the side of the track by Sid Watkins. This incident forged a strong bond between Häkkinen and team principal Ron Dennis, and also sent forth a new movement for extra safety in the sport. Luckily, Häkkinen recovered fully and was fit to race again in 1996, thus missing only one race. Häkkinen climbed back into a Formula One car at Paul Ricard three months after the accident. The final F1 race at Adelaide was won by Damon Hill in a Williams, with almost all of his main rivals including Schumacher retiring, and Hill finished two laps ahead of second-placed Olivier Panis.

Melbourne (1996–2019, 2022–present)

In 1993 prominent Melbourne businessman Ron Walker began working with the Kennett government to make Melbourne the host of the event. After the government of Jeff Kennett spent an undisclosed amount, it was announced in late 1993 (days after the South Australian election) that the race would be shifted to a rebuilt Albert Park Circuit in Melbourne. The race moved to Melbourne in 1996. The decision to hold the race there was controversial.  A series of protests were organised by the "Save Albert Park" group, which claimed that the race turned a public park into a private playground for one week per year.  Additionally, they claimed that the race cost a great deal of money that would be better spent, if it were to be spent on motor racing, on a permanent circuit elsewhere. Finally, they said that the claimed economic benefits of the race were false or exaggerated. The race organisers and the government claimed that the economic benefits to the state, although unquantifiable, outweighed the costs, and highlighted that the park's public amenities have been greatly improved from the World War II vintage facilities previously located at Albert Park; the Melbourne Sports and Aquatic Centre (scene of many Melbourne 2006 Commonwealth Games events) being the centre piece and best known of the revitalised facilities. Opponents of holding the race in the park point out that the Aquatic Centre adds nothing to the Grand Prix, is effectively closed for weeks surrounding the event and could have been built independent of the car race.

Bernie Ecclestone, the then president of Formula One Management, the group that runs modern-day Formula One in conjunction with the Federation Internationale de l'Automobile (FIA), once famously said that it took 10 minutes to do the deal with Melbourne that would see the Victorian capital host the Australian Grand Prix from 1996. It was thought that Melbourne's unsuccessful quest to stage the 1996 Olympic Games, and the subsequently successful bid by northern rival city Sydney to host the 2000 Summer Olympics, was a driving force behind Melbourne's motivation to wrest the Australian Grand Prix away from Adelaide. The Australian Grand Prix at Adelaide in 1985–1995 was always the last event in the Formula One calendar – but from 1996 onwards, it has usually been the first event or was held early in the season.

Albert Park, within easy reach of the Melbourne central business district, became home to the Australian Grand Prix in Melbourne. A 16-turn circuit, which measures  in its current guise, it was built utilising a combination of public roads and a car park within the park. The circuit is renowned as being a smooth and high-speed test for Formula One teams and drivers. Its characteristics are similar to the only other street circuit set in a public park used in the Formula One World Championship, the Circuit Gilles Villeneuve in Montreal which hosts the Canadian Grand Prix.
The promotional theme for the first race in Melbourne was "Melbourne – What a Great Place for the Race". Some 401,000 people turned out for the four days leading up to and including the first race in 1996, which remains a record for the event. The logistics of creating a temporary circuit and hosting an event of the magnitude of a Formula One Grand Prix from scratch were not lost on the international visitors, with Melbourne winning the F1 Constructors' Association Award for the best organised Grand Prix of the year in its first two years (1996 and 1997).

It took just three corners for the Australian Grand Prix at Albert Park to gain worldwide attention. On the first lap of the first race in 1996, Jordan's Martin Brundle was launched into the air in an enormous accident. Footage of the crash, and Brundle's subsequent rush back to the pits to take the spare car for the restart, ensured the first race in Melbourne gained widespread coverage. The race was won by Williams's Damon Hill.
 The 1997 race saw McLaren, through David Coulthard, break a drought of 50 races without a victory. The next year was a McLaren benefit, with Mika Häkkinen and Coulthard lapping the entire field en route to a dominant 1–2 finish. The result was clouded by controversy when Coulthard pulled over with two laps remaining to allow Häkkinen to win, honouring a pre-race agreement between the pair that whoever made it to the first corner in the lead on lap one would be allowed to win. Ferrari won its first Grand Prix in Melbourne in 1999, but it was not with team number one Michael Schumacher. Northern Irishman Eddie Irvine took his maiden victory after the all-conquering McLarens of Häkkinen and Coulthard retired before half-distance. Schumacher broke his Melbourne drought the following year when he headed a dominant Ferrari 1–2 with new teammate Rubens Barrichello. The 2001 event, also won by Michael Schumacher, was marked by tragedy when 52-year-old volunteer marshal Graham Beveridge was killed after a high-speed accident involving Ralf Schumacher and Jacques Villeneuve on lap five. Villeneuve's B.A.R. rode up across the back of Schumacher's Williams and crashed into the fence, behind which Beveridge was standing; Beveridge was hit by a tyre that flew off of Villeneuve's car.

The start of the 2002 race saw pole-sitter Barrichello and Williams's Ralf Schumacher come together at Turn One in a spectacular accident that saw 11 of the 22 cars eliminated before the end of the opening lap. Michael Schumacher dominated thereafter to post a third straight Melbourne win, but his achievements were overshadowed by the fifth place of Australian Mark Webber on his Formula One debut. Webber, in an underpowered and underfunded Minardi, had to recover from a botched late pit stop and resist the challenges of Toyota's Mika Salo in the closing stages, and took to the podium after the race with Australian team owner Paul Stoddart in one of Melbourne's more memorable Grand Prix moments. The next year, 2003, saw Coulthard again win for McLaren in a race held in variable conditions. Normal service was resumed in 2004 with the Ferraris of Schumacher and Barrichello running rampant – within two laps of Friday practice, Schumacher had obliterated the Albert Park lap record, and sailed to a crushing win. In 2005, the race was won by Renault's Giancarlo Fisichella after a storm during Saturday qualifying produced a topsy-turvy grid. Barrichello and Fisichella's teammate Fernando Alonso came through the field from 11th and 13th on the grid respectively to join pole sitter Fisichella on the podium.

In 2006, Alonso took his first Australian win in an accident-marred race that featured four safety car periods. In 2007 Kimi Räikkönen won in his first race for Ferrari, while rookie Lewis Hamilton became the first driver in 11 years to finish on the podium in his F1 debut, finishing third behind his McLaren teammate Alonso. Hamilton won the 2008 race which had three safety car periods and only six finishers. In 2009 Jenson Button took the victory, driving for debutant team Brawn GP, which was having its first race after Ross Brawn had bought the team following Honda's withdrawal from Formula One. The team was formed from the remnants of Honda Racing F1 who had withdrawn from the sport following the 2008 season. The race ended with Button, who had led from the start, leading the field over the line after the safety car had been deployed with three laps remaining following a crash between Sebastian Vettel and Robert Kubica, who had been fighting for second place.  This promoted Button's teammate, fellow Brawn GP driver Rubens Barrichello, to second, marking a historic 1-2 for the team.  Toyota's Jarno Trulli was given a 25-second penalty for passing Lewis Hamilton for third place under yellow flags during that safety car period, which promoted Hamilton into that position. However, Hamilton was later disqualified and docked his points for "deliberately misleading stewards", with Trulli reinstated in third. The results earned by Brawn, Williams, and Toyota were awarded, despite an appeal being held two weeks later against a ruling on the legality of the teams' diffuser design. The outcome of the appeal was in favour of the teams, their diffusers were declared legal under the new rules and there were no changes to the results of the race.

2010 again saw Button win at Melbourne. Starting from fourth, he gambled on an early change to slick tires under drying conditions that let him move up to second place after losing several positions at the start. Sebastian Vettel retired with mechanical issues after qualifying on pole and leading until his retirement, handing Button the victory. The 2011 race saw Vettel take victory in the Red Bull, with Hamilton second and Vitaly Petrov third for Lotus.  This was the first ever podium for a Russian Formula One driver. 2012 saw Button win for the third time in four years at the circuit. 2013 saw a surprise victory with Raikkonen in the Lotus winning from Alonso and Vettel.  The reintroduction of V6 turbo hybrid engines for  saw a dominant performance from Mercedes's Nico Rosberg at the Grand Prix, who took the victory from the McLarens of Kevin Magnussen and Button, both of whom were promoted due to the disqualification of Daniel Ricciardo in the Red Bull post race for illegal fuel flow. 2015 saw Hamilton take the victory from teammate Rosberg, with Vettel completing the top three.

In 2020, it was planned to hold the Grand Prix despite the coronavirus epidemic in the country. Ferrari and AlphaTauri as teams based in Italy, the most coronavirus-infected country in Europe at the time, expressed concern about the possibility of leaving the quarantine zone. One of McLaren's mechanics got flu-like symptoms when he arrived in Australia, his coronavirus test returned positive and the British team withdrew from the race. Later, a photographer was also confirmed to have coronavirus. It was announced that the Grand Prix would still take place, but without spectators, however two hours before the first practice started the event was cancelled.

After a two-year absence as a result of the COVID-19 pandemic, the Australian Grand Prix returned in 2022. Unlike previous years, when it was the opening event of the season, the 2022 Australian Grand Prix was instead the third event of the season. In the months before the Grand Prix, in consultation with drivers, the circuit underwent several significant revisions, which were the first and most significant changes since the inaugural 1996 Australian Grand Prix, including the first track resurfacing since then. Turns 9 and 10 were completely redesigned; where they formed a right–left chicane with a heavy braking zone on the approach, the redesign saw them removed. This was done to raise the approach speed for  old turns 11 and 12. Several other corners were reprofiled to encourage overtaking, most notably the old turn 13, which was widened to create additional racing lines. Positive camber was also added to allow drivers to carry more speed through the corner. The main straight and pit lane were also redesigned, with the pit lane wall moved two metres closer to the circuit so that the edge of the circuit sat directly next to the wall. The 2022 Grand Prix saw Ferrari's Charles Leclerc achieve his first career grand slam, having started in pole position, set the fastest lap, led every lap, and won the race ahead of Red Bull's Sergio Pérez and Mercedes' George Russell. It was the first grand slam for an individual Ferrari driver since Fernando Alonso's at the 2010 Singapore Grand Prix. The 2022 edition set a new attendance record at the circuit for the weekend, with a reported 419,114 attendees, including 128,294 on race day; these figures made the 2022 Grand Prix the highest attended Grand Prix ever held in Melbourne and one of the most popular sporting weekends in Australian history.

In June 2022, Melbourne's contract to host the Australian Grand Prix, which was due to expire in 2025, was extended to 2035. The new contract stipulates that the Australian Grand Prix will be one of the first three rounds of the season over the contract period and will host a minimum of five season-opening races over the 13 years between 2023 and 2035. From 2023, Formula Two and Formula Three races will form part of the race weekend schedule.

Calendar change
The move of the Australian Grand Prix to Melbourne saw a change in the time of year that the F1 teams and personnel made their annual voyage Down Under.  Adelaide, for each of its 11 years, was the final race of the F1 season, usually in October or November, while Melbourne has been the first race of the season in 20 of the 25 times it has hosted the Grand Prix. As such, the Albert Park circuit has seen the Formula One debuts of many drivers. 1997 World Champion Jacques Villeneuve made his race debut in Melbourne's first year of 1996, and became one of three men to secure pole position in his maiden Grand Prix. Other prominent names to debut in Melbourne are seven-time world champion Lewis Hamilton (2007), two-time World Champion Fernando Alonso and one-time champion Kimi Räikkönen (both in 2001); former Australian F1 driver, Mark Webber, also made his debut there in 2002.

As part of celebrations for the tenth running of the event at Albert Park in 2005, Webber drove his Williams F1 car over the Sydney Harbour Bridge in a promotional event, and the Melbourne city streets hosted a parade of F1 machinery and Supercars, Australia's highest-profile domestic motor sport category. For over thirty years, Supercars have competed in the Supercars Challenge non-championship event at the Australian Grand Prix. In 2018, the event was contested for championship points for the first time, and was known as the Melbourne 400.

The 2021 event was originally scheduled to open the season in March, but moved to November due to ongoing COVID-19 restrictions and travel disruptions, then cancelled on 6 July. It was also going through several changes to make the track faster.

Economic impact
An issue that is frequently debated amongst both supporters and opponents of the Australian Grand Prix centres around the event's economic impact for the state of Victoria; proponents of the event claim that the event increases tourism, creates jobs and generates millions of dollars for the state of Victoria, while opponents dispute the event's economic benefits and cite the cost on taxpayers to host the event, as well as the disruptions generated by the event. In 2014, the Victorian government claimed the annual economic impact of hosting the Australian Grand Prix was between $32 million and $39 million, with the event generating significant economic, social and cultural benefits including job creation, industry development, inward investment and tourism, while opponents of the event claimed that the event cost Victorian taxpayers over $50 million to host.

According to a 2022 economic impact assessment conducted by EY, the 2022 Australian Grand Prix generated an estimated $92 million of direct spending in the Victorian economy and boosted Victoria's Gross State Product by an estimated $171 million, with the Grand Prix also credited for driving up hotel occupancy and stimulating patronage for hospitality businesses. This mirrors a 2011 EY report commissioned by Tourism Victoria, which found international exposure and tourism spending stemming from hosting the Grand Prix generated between $32.04 million and $39.34 million for Victoria's Gross State Product during the period in which the Grand Prix was held, while also generating between 351 and 411 full-time equivalent jobs.

However, a cost-benefit analysis of the Australian Grand Prix done for the Auditor-General in 2005 revealed a net economic loss for Victoria, with the estimated costs of the event exceeding the benefits to Victorian taxpayers by 5 per cent., a 2007 auditor-general's report found costs to host the event exceeded benefits by $6.7 million, while a 2012 report commissioned by Economists at Large for Save Albert Park estimated that the 2012 Grand Prix resulted in a net economic loss to Victoria of between $48.8m and $66.7m, with a mid-range estimate of $60.55m. The 2007 Australian Grand Prix ran at a $34.6 million loss, while according to Crikey, the Australian Grand Prix made losses of $59.97 million in 2014, $61.7 million in 2015, $61 million in 2016 and $57.1 million in 2017.

Over the decade preceding 2022, the Australian Grand Prix collectively cost Victorian taxpayers $537.5 million to host, with the 2022 Australian Grand Prix alone costing Victorian taxpayers $78.1 million to host; the 2022 event generated $75.1 million in revenue but cost $153.2 million to stage.

Spectator attendance since 1995

Following the move of the Australian Grand Prix to Melbourne, spectator attendance peaked at an estimated 419,114 in 2022, but have never reached that of the last Adelaide race in 1995.

In 2009, the global financial crisis, higher unemployment and a snap public transport strike were cited by Victorian Premier John Brumby as a reason for a slight drop in crowds. Attendance numbers improved in 2010 to an estimate of 305,000 – the largest since the 2005 race.

In contrast to other major sporting events in Australia such as the AFL Grand Final, the Melbourne Cup, the Australian Open and the Boxing Day Test, the Australian Grand Prix Corporation does not release precise crowd figures for the Australian Grand Prix, citing security concerns; the Australian Grand Prix Corporation believes that crowd figures are sensitive from a security and safety perspective, and disclosing it has the potential to affect the security of Victoria by assisting the operational system of possible threat actors.

Official attendance numbers, which are inexact and have been frequently challenged as gross overestimates, have been as follows:

1995 (Adelaide) – 520,000 (210,000 on race day)
1996 (Melbourne) – 401,000 (150,000 on race day)
1997 – 289,000
2004 – 360,885 (121,500 on race day)
2005 – 359,000  (103,000 on race day)
2006 – 301,800
2007 – 301,000 (105,000 on race day)
2008 – 303,000 (108,000 on race day)
2009 – 286,900
2010 – 305,000 (108,500 on race day)
2011 – 298,000 (111,000 on race day)
2012 – 313,700 (114,900 on race day)
2013 – 323,000 (103,000 on race day)
2014 – 314,900 (100,500 on race day)
2015 – 296,600 (101,000 on race day)
2016 – 272,300 (90,200 on race day)
2017 – 296,600
2018 – 295,000
2019 – 324,000 (100,000 on race day)
2022 – 419,114 (128,294 on race day)

Winners

Repeat winners (drivers)
Drivers in bold are competing in the Formula One championship in the current season.
A pink background indicates an event which was not part of the Formula One World Championship.

As of the 2022 edition, four-time World Drivers' Champion Alain Prost remains the only driver to win the race in both World Championship and domestic formats. Prost won the Australian Drivers' Championship 1982 race, driving a Formula Pacific Ralt RT4, before winning in Adelaide in 1986 and 1988 in Formula One.

Australian driver Lex Davison and German driver Michael Schumacher are the most successful drivers in the 86-year history of the event taking four wins each, while McLaren and Ferrari have been the most successful constructors with twelve victories each.

Repeat winners (constructors)
Teams in bold are competing in the Formula One championship in the current season.
A pink background indicates an event which was not part of the Formula One World Championship.

Repeat winners (engine manufacturers)
Manufacturers in bold are competing in the Formula One championship in the current season.
A pink background indicates an event which was not part of the Formula One World Championship.

* Between 1997 and 2003 built by Ilmor

** Between 1968 and 1993 designed and built by Cosworth, funded by Ford

By year

A pink background indicates an event which was not part of the Formula One World Championship.
 * From 1932 to 1948, the winner was determined on a handicap basis.
 + The 1937 event was staged as the "South Australian Centenary Grand Prix" on 26 December 1936.
 # The 1928 event was officially known as the "100 Miles Road Race".

Notes

See also

Motorsport in Australia
Albert Park Circuit
List of Australian motor racing series

References

Further reading

External links

 The Australian Grand Prix official website
 Australian Grand Prix Statistics
 Melbourne Formula 1 Statistics
 Melbourne GP Circuit on Google Maps (current Formula 1 tracks)

 
Pre-World Championship Grands Prix
Formula One Grands Prix
National Grands Prix
Grand Prix
Recurring sporting events established in 1928
1928 establishments in Australia
Sport in Melbourne
Tasman Series